Cystorchis is a genus of flowering plants from the orchid family, Orchidaceae. It has 21 currently accepted species (June 2014), native to New Guinea, Southeast Asia, and the islands of the western Pacific.

Cystorchis aberrans J.J.Sm.
Cystorchis aphylla Ridl.
Cystorchis appendiculata J.J.Sm.
Cystorchis celebica Schltr.
Cystorchis dentifera Schltr.
Cystorchis gracilis (Hook.f.) Holttum
Cystorchis javanica (Blume) Blume
Cystorchis luzonensis Ames
Cystorchis macrophysa Schltr.
Cystorchis marginata Blume
Cystorchis ogurae (Tuyama) Ormerod & P.J.Cribb
Cystorchis orphnophilla Schltr.
Cystorchis peliocaulos Schltr.
Cystorchis ranaiensis J.J.Sm.
Cystorchis rostellata J.J.Sm.
Cystorchis saccosepala J.J.Sm.
Cystorchis salmoneus J.J.Wood
Cystorchis saprophytica J.J.Sm.
Cystorchis stenoglossa Schltr.
Cystorchis variegata Blume
Cystorchis versteegii J.J.Sm.

See also 
 List of Orchidaceae genera

References 

  (1859) Collection des Orchidées le plus remarquables de l'Archipel Indien et du Japon: 87, t. 24, 36.
  (2003). Genera Orchidacearum 3: 137 ff. Oxford University Press.
  2005. Handbuch der Orchideen-Namen. Dictionary of Orchid Names. Dizionario dei nomi delle orchidee. Ulmer, Stuttgart

External links 
 

Cranichideae genera
Goodyerinae
Myco-heterotrophic orchids